The 2012 European Champion Cup Final Four was an international baseball competition being held in Nettuno, Italy on August 29–30, 2012. It featured the 4 best teams of the 2012 European Cup.

Teams
The following four teams qualified for the 2012 Final Four.

Schedule and results

External links
Schedule and results

References

Final Four (Baseball), 2012
European Champion Cup Final Four
International baseball competitions hosted by Italy